The Little Tigers, Little Tiger, or variant, may refer to:

Asian Tigers (economics), the subset of Singapore and Hong Kong
The Little Tigers (comic), an American comic strip by Jimmy Swinnerton, which followed The Little Bears and later grew into Mr. Jack
Xiao Hu Dui, a Taiwanese idol band which was formed in 1988 and disbanded in 1995
Little Tiger Press, a publisher in the UK, see List of UK children's book publishers
"Little Tiger", a 2009 song by Tune-Yards, from the album Bird-Brains

See also
Two little tigers, a nursery rhyme
Little tiger blue (Tarucus balkanicus), a butterfly
Tiger (disambiguation)